Lees Station (also Lee, Lees, or Let) is an unincorporated community in Bledsoe County, Tennessee, United States.  It lies along U.S. Route 127 southwest of the city of Pikeville, the county seat of Bledsoe County.  Its elevation is 853 feet (260 m), and it is at  (35.5574281, -85.2507964).  The various forms of its names led the Board on Geographic Names officially to designate it Lees in 1916.  In 1969, the official name was changed to Lees Station.

References

Unincorporated communities in Bledsoe County, Tennessee
Unincorporated communities in Tennessee